Coming Up Roses is a 2011 American drama film directed by Lisa Albright and starring Bernadette Peters and Rachel Brosnahan.

Cast
Bernadette Peters as Diane
Rachel Brosnahan as Alice
Peter Friedman as Charles
Reyna de Courcy as Cat
Shannon Esper as Cherie
Ann Dowd as Lynne
Jayce Bartok as Jimmy

Release
The film premiered at the Woodstock Film Festival on September 23, 2011. It was then released in limited theaters on November 9, 2012.

Reception
The film has a 17% rating on Rotten Tomatoes.

References

External links
 
 

American drama films
2011 drama films
2011 films
2010s English-language films
2010s American films